Six Pack is a 1982 American comedy-drama film directed by Daniel Petrie and starring Kenny Rogers, Diane Lane, Erin Gray, Anthony Michael Hall and Barry Corbin.

Plot
When race car driver Brewster Baker stops at a gas station in a small Texas town, parts are stolen from his race car. While at a local diner, he sees people stealing parts from another car, so he gives chase.

When the thieves' van goes into a river, Brewster rescues them and discovers that they are orphaned children. The kids were stealing for "Big John" the corrupt county sheriff, who jails Brewster for breaking and entering, larceny, resisting arrest and speeding.

After the kids help break Brewster out of jail, Brewster reluctantly takes the children with him. They prevent the sheriff from giving chase by loosening many bolts on the car, like those on the doors and hood and the lug nuts.

Arriving in Shreveport, LA, while Brewster is in a bar reacquainting himself with Lilah, the kids steal parts off other cars to reequip his car. He is able to come in fourth in the Dixie 100, but uses most of his winnings paying back the drivers whose car parts the kids took.

At the next track in Mississippi, Breezy distracts Terk while her brothers tinker with his car. 
A few races later, he tries to get revenge on Brewster and the kids by calling the law on them. As they have formed a friendship and bonded, Brewster breaks them out by impersonating the law.

Finally sponsored by Ford, Brewster gets a new car for the Atlanta 500. Lilah surprises him there. Terk and some men jump him, dumping him in the woods. He comes to, hitches a ride, and makes it to the track in time to race. In contention for the win against Terk, he swerves off the track, cutting off the Texas sheriff as he tries to take the kids away.

Brewster and Lilah marry, adopting the kids.

The end of the movie features real race footage from the 1982 NASCAR Coca-Cola 500, held at Atlanta Motor Speedway and won that year by Darrell Waltrip.

Cast

Music
The theme song to the film is "Love Will Turn You Around", a song performed and co-written by Rogers that was a #1 country and adult contemporary hit. It peaked at #13 on the pop chart. Miles Goodman served as an orchestrator for the film's score.

Box office
The film had a limited release on July 16, 1982, and went wide on July 23, 1982. It proved to be a moderate hit at the box office and grossed over $20 million during its theatrical run.

Reception
Janet Maslin of The New York Times in her review, called Six Pack "good-natured but none-too-interesting" as a typical fable where "orphans find a father, a lonely man finds a good woman, an unsuccessful racer makes good on the comeback trail, and everybody lives unreasonably happily ever after."

Filming locations

Parts of the movie were filmed in Jefferson, Georgia, at Jefco Speedway also known as Georgia International Speedway and Peach State Speedway now known as Gresham Motorsports Park. Some local Jefferson
teens were used as extras in the film. Notable NASCAR racing legends raced at the track such as Bobby Isaac, ‘(Tiger Tom)' Tom Pistone, Jody Ridley, LeeRoy Yarbrough, Wendell Scott, Mark Martin, Freddy Fryar, Darrell Waltrip, Alan Kulwicki, Larry Pearson and Rusty Wallace. ‘Alabama Gang’ racing legends Neil Bonnett, Bobby Allison, Donnie Allison and Davey Allison.

The film crew worked from the Holiday Inn Powers Ferry in Atlanta, Georgia. At least one scene was filmed in a guest room there. Another scene was filmed at a pub located in a strip mall up the hill from the Holiday Inn.

The jail and sheriff car sabotage scenes were filmed in downtown Buford, Georgia.

The scene with the van going in the river was filmed in Suwanee, Georgia, at Settles Bridge at the Chattahoochee River.

The movie also features the bas-relief Confederate memorial sculpture at Stone Mountain in one scene.

The car chase scene was shot on Poplar Springs Road in Powder Springs, Georgia.

The wedding scene was shot at McEachearn United Methodist Church in Powder Springs.

Television show
In 1983, there was a spin-off television series pilot of the same name which featured Don Johnson as Brewster Baker and Markie Post as Sally Leadbetter. This show also featured Joaquin Phoenix (billed as Leaf Phoenix) in his second role.

Home media
The film was released on VHS on May 19, 1993. It has been released twice on DVD, the first time on April 4, 2006, followed by a second release on July 3, 2012.

, the feature has not been released in the digital format.

In popular culture
Six Pack is mentioned prominently in "Breakfast in Dubbo", the ninth chapter of New Zealand-Australian comedian Tony Martin's collection of autobiographical essays, Lolly Scramble: A Memoir of Little Consequence (2005). In "Breakfast in Dubbo," Martin recounts a lengthy bus trip in New South Wales that took place in 1986, during which the passengers were given the opportunity to vote for a movie to watch on video. Passengers were invited to vote for either Excalibur, Beverly Hills Cop, This is Spinal Tap, or Six Pack. Despite Martin's attempts to drum up support for This is Spinal Tap, the majority of passengers voted to watch Six Pack, to Martin's dismay. Martin recorded a spoken-word version of "Breakfast in Dubbo" which appears as track 27 on the CD Get This: Illegal Download (2006).

Six Pack is mentioned in the TV show Squidbillies Season 2 Episode 11 "Terminus Trouble". In the episode, Early Cuyler, his son Rusty, and the Sheriff make a trip to Atlanta, Georgia and visit a location used in the film.

In 2019, Jonathan Davenport ran a Brewster Baker-inspired paint scheme in dirt late model's biggest race, the World 100 at Eldora Speedway, and won the race. The following year, NASCAR Gander RV & Outdoors Truck Series driver Ty Majeski’s truck was wrapped in the style of Brewster's car for the Southern 500 throwback weekend at Darlington Raceway.

The movie was featured on the full Kenny Rogers tribute episode of the Disasters In The Making podcast in April 2020.

References

External links

 
 
 

1982 films
1980s sports comedy-drama films
American sports comedy-drama films
American auto racing films
Country music films
Films directed by Daniel Petrie
Films scored by Charles Fox
Films set in Texas
Films set in Atlanta
20th Century Fox films
1982 comedy films
1982 drama films
1980s English-language films
1980s American films